Justino Tavares da Veiga is a São Tomé and Príncipean politician. He was Minister of Justice, Reform and the State, Public Administration, and Parliamentary Affairs in the XIII Constitutional Government of São Tomé and Príncipe, until he resigned on 4 January 2010 along with the Minister for Natural Resources, Energy, and the Environment Cristina Dias, after leaving the majority party Force for Change Democratic Movement – Liberal Party.

In 2017, Prime Minister of São Tomé and Príncipe Patrice Trovoada accused Veiga and two other former members of parliament of taking bribes in a case related to the sale of brewery Cervejeira Rosema to an Angolan company.

References 

Year of birth missing (living people)
Living people
Force for Change Democratic Movement – Liberal Party politicians
Government ministers of São Tomé and Príncipe